Aaron Michael Simpson (born July 20, 1974) is an American mixed martial artist. A professional competitor from 2000 until 2013, he is perhaps best known for his 11-fight stint with the UFC, but also fought for the pre-Zuffa owned WEC and the World Series of Fighting.

Background
Simpson was born in Gunnison, Colorado and grew up in Wellton, Arizona, where he attended Antelope Union High School. In high school he was a standout wrestler, compiling an amazing 142–1 record, and earned four state wrestling championships before going to compete in the sport for Arizona State University originally as a walk on before earning his scholarship. He compiled 110 wins and earned NCAA All-American status in 1996 and 1998 and then became an assistant coach for ASU and spent nine years there in that position. Simpson then worked as an assistant coach at California Polytechnic State University.

Mixed martial arts

World Extreme Cagefighting
Simpson made his WEC debut against accomplished grappler David Avellan at WEC 36. Simpson won in the first round with a highlight-reel KO.

Ultimate Fighting Championship
Simpson was part of the transfer of Light Heavyweight and Middleweight fighters in the WEC to the UFC. He made his debut at UFC Fight Night 18 by defeating Tim McKenzie via TKO in the first round.

He was set to have his second fight against Dan Miller on September 16, 2009, at UFC Fight Night 19. Instead the fight was moved to UFC 102 where he fought Ed Herman. Simpson won by technical knockout when Herman went down with a knee injury in the second round.

Simpson faced Tom Lawlor on January 11, 2010, at UFC Fight Night 20, defeating him via controversial split decision.

Simpson was expected to face Chris Leben at UFC 114, but the bout took place instead on June 19, 2010, at The Ultimate Fighter: Team Liddell vs. Team Ortiz Finale. Simpson lost the fight via TKO at 4:17 of round 2. Simpson started out strong, using his wrestling to bring the heavier hitting Leben down multiple times. In the second round, Simpson came out gassed and ate multiple shots against the cage before turning and running away, falling against the cage, forcing the referee to save him.

Simpson was expected to face David Branch on September 15, 2010, at UFC Fight Night 22, but was forced to pull out of the bout with a staph infection.

Simpson faced Mark Muñoz on November 20, 2010, at UFC 123.  He lost the fight via unanimous decision.

Simpson returned to winning by defeating Mario Miranda on March 26, 2011, at UFC Fight Night 24. Simpson dominated the fight by controlling Miranda on the ground en route to a unanimous decision victory. The judges scored the fight (30–27, 30–27, 30–26).

Simpson was expected to face returning UFC veteran Jason Miller on July 2, 2011 at UFC 132. However, on May 27, 2011, it was revealed that Miller would be one of the coaches of The Ultimate Fighter Season 14, opposite to Michael Bisping and had been pulled from the bout, while Simpson faced Brad Tavares. Simpson won via unanimous decision.

Simpson was expected to face Nick Catone on October 8, 2011 at UFC 136.  However, Catone was forced out of the bout after tearing an Achilles tendon, and replaced by Eric Schafer, who he defeated by unanimous decision.

Simpson faced Ronny Markes on February 15, 2012 at UFC on Fuel TV 1. Markes defeated Simpson via split decision.

Following his split decision loss to Markes, Simpson confirmed he would drop down to the Welterweight division.

Simpson was expected to face Jon Fitch on July 11, 2012 at UFC on Fuel TV: Munoz vs. Weidman.  However, Fitch pulled out of the bout citing a knee injury and was replaced by returning veteran Kenny Robertson. Simpson won a unanimous decision over Robertson.

Simpson fought Mike Pierce on October 5, 2012 at UFC on FX 5. After nearly finishing Pierce on two occasions in the first round, Simpson was knocked out 29 seconds into the second round. After the loss, the UFC chose not to renew Simpson's contract.

World Series of Fighting
Following his UFC release, Simpson signed with the new MMA company World Series of Fighting.  He fought Josh Burkman at World Series of Fighting 2 on March 23, 2013. He lost his debut via TKO in the first round.

Personal life
Simpson and his wife Kendra Sirignano have twins, a boy named Domenico and a girl named Mia, who were born in June 2008 via a surrogate, Simpson's mother-in-law. The couple also adopted a 16-year-old girl named Claire. Simpson and Sirignano also competed individually on an episode of American Gladiators Season Two against another married couple.
Simpson and his wife are vegetarians. "I read a book called ‘Eating Animals’ that changed my thoughts,” he said. “And I’m an animal lover. I couldn’t justify what I was eating any more by the way meat is factory produced now and full of hormones, the way the animals are killed, it really turns me off."

Championships and accomplishments

Collegiate wrestling
National Collegiate Athletic Association
NCAA Division I All-American out of Arizona State University (1996, 1998)
NCAA Division I 177 lb: 4th place out of Arizona State University (1998)
NCAA Division I 177 lb: 8th place out of Arizona State University (1996)
Pac-10 Conference 177 lb: Champion out of Arizona State University (1997–98)

Mixed martial arts
Ultimate Fighting Championship
Fight of the Night (One time) vs. Tom Lawlor 
Knockout of the Night (One time) vs. Tim McKenzie

Mixed martial arts record

|-
| Loss
| align=center| 12–5
| Joshua Burkman 
| KO (knee and punches)
| World Series of Fighting 2
| 
| align=center| 1
| align=center| 3:04
| Atlantic City, New Jersey, United States
| 
|-
| Loss
| align=center| 12–4
| Mike Pierce
| KO (punch)
| UFC on FX: Browne vs. Bigfoot
| 
| align=center| 2
| align=center| 0:29
| Minneapolis, Minnesota, United States
| 
|-
| Win
| align=center| 12–3
| Kenny Robertson
| Decision (unanimous)
| UFC on Fuel TV: Munoz vs. Weidman
| 
| align=center| 3
| align=center| 5:00
| San Jose, California, United States
| Welterweight debut.
|-
| Loss
| align=center| 11–3
| Ronny Markes
| Decision (split)
| UFC on Fuel TV: Sanchez vs. Ellenberger
| 
| align=center| 3
| align=center| 5:00
| Omaha, Nebraska, United States
| 
|-
| Win
| align=center| 11–2
| Eric Schafer
| Decision (unanimous)
| UFC 136
| 
| align=center| 3
| align=center| 5:00
| Houston, Texas, United States
| 
|-
| Win
| align=center| 10–2 
| Brad Tavares
| Decision (unanimous)
| UFC 132
| 
| align=center| 3
| align=center| 5:00
| Las Vegas, Nevada, United States
| 
|-
| Win
| align=center| 9–2
| Mario Miranda
| Decision (unanimous)
| UFC Fight Night: Nogueira vs. Davis
| 
| align=center| 3
| align=center| 5:00
| Seattle, Washington, United States
| 
|-
| Loss
| align=center| 8–2
| Mark Muñoz
| Decision (unanimous)
| UFC 123
| 
| align=center| 3
| align=center| 5:00
| Auburn Hills, Michigan, United States
| 
|-
| Loss
| align=center| 8–1
| Chris Leben
| TKO (punches)
| The Ultimate Fighter: Team Liddell vs. Team Ortiz Finale
| 
| align=center| 2
| align=center| 4:17
| Las Vegas, Nevada, United States
| 
|-
| Win
| align=center| 8–0
| Tom Lawlor
| Decision (split)
| UFC Fight Night: Maynard vs. Diaz
| 
| align=center| 3
| align=center| 5:00
| Fairfax, Virginia, United States
| 
|-
| Win
| align=center| 7–0
| Ed Herman
| TKO (knee injury)
| UFC 102
| 
| align=center| 2
| align=center| 0:17
| Portland, Oregon, United States
| 
|-
| Win
| align=center| 6–0
| Tim McKenzie
| TKO (punches)
| UFC Fight Night: Condit vs. Kampmann
| 
| align=center| 1
| align=center| 1:40
| Nashville, Tennessee, United States
| 
|-
| Win
| align=center| 5–0
| David Avellan
| KO (punch)
| WEC 36: Faber vs. Brown
| 
| align=center| 1
| align=center| 0:18
| Hollywood, Florida, United States
| 
|-
| Win
| align=center| 4–0
| Travis Degraw
| TKO (punches)
| Full Moon Fighting 2
| 
| align=center| 3
| align=center| 3:22
| Rocky Point, Mexico
| 
|-
| Win
| align=center| 3–0
| Scott Dingman
| TKO (punches)
| Tuff-N-Uff: Thompson vs. Troyer
| 
| align=center| 1
| align=center| 2:40
| Las Vegas, Nevada, United States
| 
|-
| Win
| align=center| 2–0
| Tim Coulson
| TKO (punches)
| Proving Grounds 2
| 
| align=center| 1
| align=center| 3:44
| Cayman Islands
| 
|-
| Win
| align=center| 1–0
| Billy Onlewski
| Submission (rear-naked choke)
| Arizona Cage Combat
| 
| align=center| 1
| align=center| 4:02
| Payson, Arizona, United States
|

References

External links

Aaron Simpson profile at the National Wrestling Hall of Fame
Official UFC Profile
 Aaron Simpson from UFC Fans

Living people
American male mixed martial artists
1974 births
American male sport wrestlers
Amateur wrestlers
Middleweight mixed martial artists
Mixed martial artists utilizing collegiate wrestling
Mixed martial artists utilizing Brazilian jiu-jitsu
People from Gunnison, Colorado
Ultimate Fighting Championship male fighters
American practitioners of Brazilian jiu-jitsu